Carnasserie Castle (also spelled Carnassarie) is a ruined 16th-century tower house, noted for its unusual plan and renaissance detailing.

History
The castle was built by reforming churchman John Carswell, who was Rector of Kilmartin, Chancellor of the Chapel Royal at Stirling, and later titular Bishop of the Isles. Carswell published the first book to be printed in Scottish Gaelic, a translation of John Knox's Book of Common Order. Construction began in 1565 using masons brought from Stirling; although notionally built for Carswell's patron, the Earl of Argyll, he intended it as a personal residence for himself.

On Carswell's death in 1572, the castle passed to the Earl of Argyll and was sold in 1643 to Donald Campbell of Auchinleck. His successor Duncan Campbell was one of the few to actively support Argyll's Rising against James VII in 1685. The Atholl Raid that followed the failure of the Rising devastated large parts of Argyllshire; despite recovering his estates in 1689, Duncan Campbell was financially ruined. In 1690, he petitioned Parliament claiming Maclean clansmen burnt Carnasserie Castle, stole 2,000 cattle and murdered his uncle Alexander Campbell of Strondour. Although the outer walls remain largely undamaged, Carnasserie was never rebuilt and the Auchinbrecks eventually went bankrupt. In the 19th century the estate was sold to the Malcolms of Poltalloch, who also own nearby Duntrune Castle. Today the castle and its surroundings are protected as a scheduled monument. The castle is in the care of Historic Environment Scotland and is open to the public.

Architecture

Carnasserie has only ever been slightly altered, in the late 17th century, and so presents an accurate picture of 16th-century architecture. Although sited on raised ground close to a strategic pass at the head of Kilmartin Glen, it was designed more for domestic rather than military purposes.

The castle comprises a 5-storey tower house, with a longer three storey hall house, providing a substantial range of accommodation. At basement level are the remains of cellars and a kitchen with a large fireplace and water inlet. Above this is the large hall. This is connected to a large drawing room in the tower house, which retains its stone floor and large fireplace with finely carved stone decoration. A broad stair rises from the entrance to the hall, contained in a small tower to the north-west. A second smaller stair leads up from the hall to the parapet walk on three sides of the tower house. Upper rooms would have contained bedrooms.

The exterior displays numerous "double keyhole" gunloops, as well as decorative string courses and corbelling. Over the entrance are blank panels framed by carved supports, as well as the arms of the 5th Earl of Argyll with the Gaelic motto DIA LE UA NDUIBHNE, "God be with O'Duine", referring to the semi-legendary ancestors of Clan Campbell. At the top of the tower are the remains of open rounds along the parapet, and a cap-house above the stair. Fragments of carved drain spouts have been found, and are on display in the cellars.

To the south and west is a partially walled courtyard garden. An archway bears the inscription SDC LHL 1681, for Sir Duncan Campbell, 4th Baronet and Lady Henrietta Lindsay, whose support for Argyll's uprising led to the castle's destruction.

References

Coventry, Martin The Castles of Scotland (3rd Edition), Goblinshead, 2001
Lindsay, Maurice The Castles of Scotland, Constable & Co. 1986
Walker, Frank Arneil The Buildings of Scotland: Argyll and Bute, Penguin, 2000

External links

Gazetteer for Scotland: Carnasserie Castle

Houses completed in the 16th century
Ruined castles in Argyll and Bute
Scheduled Ancient Monuments in Argyll and Bute
Historic Scotland properties in Argyll and Bute
Tower houses in Scotland